Kevin Wayne Durant (born September 29, 1988), also known by his initials KD, is an American professional basketball player for the Phoenix Suns of the National Basketball Association (NBA). He played one season of college basketball for the Texas Longhorns, and was selected as the second overall pick by the Seattle SuperSonics in the 2007 NBA draft. He played nine seasons with the franchise, which became the Oklahoma City Thunder in 2008, before signing with the Golden State Warriors in 2016, winning consecutive NBA championships and NBA Finals MVP Awards in 2017 and 2018. After sustaining an Achilles injury in the 2019 finals, he joined the Brooklyn Nets as a free agent that summer. Following disagreements with the Nets' front office, he requested a trade during the 2022 offseason and was eventually traded to the Suns in 2023. Durant is widely regarded as one of the greatest players and scorers of all time.

Durant was a heavily recruited high school prospect who was widely regarded as the second-best player in his class. In college, he won numerous year-end awards and became the first freshman to be named Naismith College Player of the Year. As a professional, he has won two NBA championships, an NBA Most Valuable Player Award, two Finals MVP Awards, two NBA All-Star Game Most Valuable Player Awards, four NBA scoring titles, the NBA Rookie of the Year Award, been named to ten All-NBA teams (including six First Teams), and selected 13 times as an NBA All-Star. In 2021, Durant was named to the NBA 75th Anniversary Team. As a member of the U.S. men's national team, Durant has won three gold medals in the Olympics (2012, 2016, and 2020) and is the leading scorer in Team USA's men's Olympic basketball history. He also won gold at the 2010 FIBA World Championship.

Off the court, Durant is one of the highest-earning basketball players in the world, due in part to endorsement deals with companies such as Foot Locker and Nike. He has developed a reputation for philanthropy and regularly leads the league in All-Star votes and jersey sales. In recent years, he has contributed to The Players' Tribune as both a photographer and writer. In 2012, he ventured into acting, appearing in the film Thunderstruck.

Early life
Durant was born on September 29, 1988, in Washington, D.C., to Wanda (née Durant) and Wayne Pratt. When Durant was an infant, his father deserted the family; Wanda and Wayne eventually divorced, and Durant's grandmother Barbara Davis helped raise him. By age 13, his father reentered his life and traveled the country with him to basketball tournaments. Durant has a sister, Brianna, and two brothers, Tony and Rayvonne.

Durant and his siblings grew up in Prince George's County, Maryland, on the eastern outskirts of Washington, D.C. He was unusually tall from a young age, and reached  in height while still in middle school (age 10–12). Growing up, Durant wanted to play for his favorite team, the Toronto Raptors, which included his favorite player, Vince Carter. He played Amateur Athletic Union (AAU) basketball for several teams in the Maryland area and was teammates with future NBA players Michael Beasley, Greivis Vásquez, and Ty Lawson, the first of whom Durant remains friends with to this day.
 During this time, he began wearing #35 as his jersey number in honor of his AAU coach, Charles Craig, who was murdered at the age of 35.

Prior to the start of the season, he committed to the University of Texas at Austin. He had visited University of Connecticut and University of North Carolina, and said he considered Duke University, University of Kentucky and University of Louisville. When asked why he chose a college with a lesser-known program, he said, "Wanted to set my own path."

At the end of the year, he was named the Washington Post All-Met Basketball Player of the Year, as well as the Most Valuable Player of the 2006 McDonald's All-American Game. He was widely regarded as the second-best high school prospect of 2006, behind Greg Oden.

Durant had stated that he would have declared for the 2006 NBA draft  if the NBA had not introduced the one-and-done rule, where his favorite team growing up, the Toronto Raptors, had the first overall pick.

College career

For the 2006–07 college season, Durantwho had grown to averaged 25.8 points, 11.1 rebounds, and 1.3 assists per game for the Texas Longhorns. Texas finished the season with a 25–10 record overall and a 12–4 record in conference. Awarded a 4 seed in the NCAA Tournament, Texas won its first round match-up against New Mexico State but was upset in the second round by USC despite a 30-point and 9-rebound performance from Durant. For his outstanding play, Durant was recognized as the unanimous national player of the year, winning the John R. Wooden Award, the Naismith College Player of the Year Award, and all eight other widely recognized honors and awards. This made Durant the first freshman to win any of the national player of the year awards. Following the season, he declared for the NBA draft. His No. 35 jersey was later retired by the Longhorns.

Professional career

Seattle SuperSonics / Oklahoma City Thunder (2007–2016)

Rookie of the Year (2007–2008) 

Durant was selected as the second overall pick in the 2007 NBA draft by the Seattle SuperSonics, after Greg Oden was selected by the Portland Trail Blazers with the first pick of the draft. In his first regular season game, the 19-year-old Durant registered 18 points, five rebounds and three steals against the Denver Nuggets. On November 16, he made the first game-winning shot of his career in a game against the Atlanta Hawks. At the conclusion of the 2007–08 NBA season, he was named the NBA Rookie of the Year following averages of 20.3 points, 4.4 rebounds and 2.4 assists per game. He joined Carmelo Anthony and LeBron James as the only teenagers in league history to average at least 20 points per game over an entire season.

Breakthrough (2008–2010) 
Following Durant's debut season, the SuperSonics relocated from Seattle to Oklahoma City, becoming the Thunder and switching to new colors – blue, orange, and yellow. The team also drafted UCLA guard Russell Westbrook, who would form an All-Star combination with Durant in later years. At the 2009 NBA All-Star Weekend, Durant set a Rookie Challenge record with 46 points. By the conclusion of the 2008–09 NBA season, he had raised his scoring average by five points from the prior season to 25.3 points per game, and was considered a strong candidate for the Most Improved Player Award, eventually finishing third in the voting.

During the 2009–10 season, Durant was selected to his first NBA All-Star Game. Behind his play, the Thunder improved their record by 27 wins from the previous year and defied expectations to make the playoffs. With a scoring average of 30.1 points per game, Durant became the youngest NBA scoring champion and was selected to his first All-NBA team. In his playoff debut, he scored 24 points in a Game 1 loss against the Los Angeles Lakers. Oklahoma City would go on to lose the series in six games, but the team's performance led many analysts to label them as an upcoming title contender.

First NBA finals (2010–2012)

Prior to the start of the 2010–11 season, Durant announced via Twitter that he had signed a five-year contract extension with the Thunder worth approximately $86 million. For the second consecutive year, he led the NBA in scoring, averaging 27.7 points a game. Behind Durant's leadership, the Thunder won 55 games and earned the fourth seed in the Western Conference. In the 2011 NBA playoffs, Oklahoma City defeated the Denver Nuggets and Memphis Grizzlies en route to a Conference Finals match-up versus the Dallas Mavericks, losing in five games.

On February 19 of the lockout-shortened 2011–12 season, Durant recorded his first career 50-point game, scoring 51 points against the Denver Nuggets. At the All-Star Game, he scored 36 points and was awarded the NBA All-Star Game Most Valuable Player Award. Durant finished the year with a scoring average of 28 points per game, representing his third straight scoring title. Behind his play, the Thunder won 47 games and entered the 2012 NBA playoffs as the Western Conference's second seed. In Game 1 of the first round against the Dallas Mavericks, Durant hit a game-winner with 1.5 seconds remaining. Oklahoma City would go on to defeat Dallas, the Lakers, and the San Antonio Spurs before losing to the Miami Heat in the 2012 NBA Finals. For the NBA Finals, Durant led all players with 30.6 points per game, doing so on a 54.8 shooting rate.

50–40–90 season (2012–2013)
With a scoring average of 28.1 points per game to finish the 2012–13 season, Durant failed to defend his scoring title; however, with a 51 percent shooting rate, a 41.6 percent three point shooting rate, and a 90.5 free throw shooting rate, he became the youngest player in NBA history to join the 50–40–90 club. Finishing the year with a 60–22 record, Oklahoma City earned the first seed in the Western Conference. In the first round of the 2014 NBA playoffs against the Houston Rockets, Westbrook tore his meniscus, forcing him to miss the remainder of the postseason. Without Westbrook, Durant was given more responsibility, averaging a career-high 30.8 points per game throughout the playoffs, but Oklahoma City were eventually eliminated in the second round by the Memphis Grizzlies in five games.

MVP season (2013–14)
In January of the 2013–14 season, Durant averaged 35.9 points per game while scoring 30 or more points in 12 straight games, including a career-high 54 points against the Golden State Warriors. In April, he surpassed Michael Jordan's record for consecutive games scoring 25 points or more at 41. The Thunder finished the year with 59 wins and Durant was voted the NBA Most Valuable Player behind averages of 32 points, 7.4 rebounds, and 5.5 assists per game. To begin the first round of the 2014 NBA playoffs, he struggled against the physical play of the Grizzlies, converting on only 24 percent of his field goals in Game 4. Through five games, the Thunder trailed the series 3–2, prompting The Oklahoman to dub Durant "Mr. Unreliable". He responded by scoring 36 points in a Game 6 victory. Oklahoma City eventually eliminated Memphis and the Los Angeles Clippers before losing to the Spurs in the Conference Finals in six games.

Final seasons with the Thunder (2014–2016)

Prior to the start of the 2014–15 season, Durant was diagnosed with a Jones fracture in his right foot and was ruled out for six to eight weeks. He subsequently missed the first 17 games of the year, making his season debut for the Thunder on December 2 against the New Orleans Pelicans. On December 18, he injured his ankle against the Golden State Warriors, returning to action on December 31 against the Phoenix Suns to score a season-high 44 points. He then sprained his left big toe in late January. On February 22, he was sidelined again after undergoing a minor procedure to help reduce pain and discomfort in his surgically repaired right foot, and on March 27, he was officially ruled out for the rest of the season after deciding to undergo foot surgery. In just 27 games, he averaged 25.4 points, 6.6 rebounds, and 4.1 assists per game.

To begin the 2015–16 season, Durant and Westbrook reached several historical milestones together, including becoming the first pair of teammates to each score at least 40 points in a single game since 1996, doing so in a win over the Orlando Magic on October 30. For the year, Durant averaged 28.2 points, 8.2 rebounds, 5 assists, and 1.2 blocks per game, leading the Thunder to 55 wins and the third seed in the West. In Game 2 of the first round of the 2016 NBA playoffs against the Mavericks, he scored 21 points but converted only 7 out of 33 shots in the worst postseason shooting performance, both by percentage and number of misses, of his career. After defeating Dallas, Oklahoma City moved on to face the Spurs in the second round, falling behind 2–1 to start the series. In Game 4, Durant tied his playoff career high with 41 points in a Thunder win. Oklahoma City eventually defeated the Spurs in six games, drawing a matchup with the record-setting 73-win Golden State Warriors in the Conference Finals. Despite going up 3–1, the Thunder were ousted in seven games, with Durant providing 27 points in Game 7.

Golden State Warriors (2016–2019)

First championship and Finals MVP (2016–2017) 
On July 4, Durant announced his intentions to sign with the Warriors in The Players' Tribune. The move was received negatively by fans and pundits, who felt that he took the easy route by leaving a team that had been up 3–1 and close to reaching the Finals to instead join their opponents, who had defeated them and were coming off a record-setting 73-win season; the Warriors had also won a championship the year before. On July 7, Durant officially signed with Golden State on a two-year, $54.3 million contract with a player option after the first year. Reflecting on the move for Sports Illustrated, Ben Golliver wrote, "He chose an ideal roster fit and a shot at playing for the highest-scoring offense the NBA has seen in decades. He chose life alongside Stephen Curry and Klay Thompson, the greatest shooting backcourt in history, and he chose to go against Andre Iguodala and Draymond Green, two elite defenders, in practices rather than in Western Conference finals games."
Durant made his debut for the Warriors on October 25 against the San Antonio Spurs, scoring a team-high 27 points in a blowout loss. On November 26, he recorded 28 points, 10 rebounds, five assists, and a career-high six blocked shots in a win over the Minnesota Timberwolves, becoming the first player in team history to finish with at least 25 points, 10 rebounds, five assists, and five blocks in a single game. On February 11, in his first game back in Oklahoma City since leaving for Golden State, Durant scored 34 points while being booed throughout the night as he helped the Warriors defeat the Thunder for the third time that year. In March, Durant suffered a Grade 2 MCL sprain and a tibial bone bruise, which forced him to miss the final 19 games of the season. Golden State finished the year with a 67–15 record and entered the playoffs as the first seed.

Durant returned from injury in time for the 2017 NBA playoffs and helped the Warriors advance to their third consecutive Finals, while also becoming the first team in league history to start the postseason 12–0. In Game 1 of the series, Durant had 38 points, eight rebounds, and eight assists to lead the Warriors past LeBron James and the defending champion Cleveland Cavaliers. Durant then helped the Warriors go up 3–0 in the series with a 31-point effort in Game 3, including the go-ahead 3-pointer with 45.3 seconds left in regulation. In Game 5, he scored 39 points to go with seven rebounds and five assists in a series-clinching win. For the Finals, Durant was the Golden State's top scorer in every game, averaging 35.2 points, 8.4 rebounds, and 5.4 assists while shooting 55.5 percent from the field, 47.4 percent from three-point range, and 92.7 percent from the free throw line. He was subsequently named the NBA Finals MVP.

Second championship and Finals MVP (2017–2018) 
After the Finals, Durant declined his $27.7 million player option and became an unrestricted free agent. On July 25, he re-signed with the Warriors for less money than the maximum, which helped the franchise create enough salary cap space to keep their core roster intact and add free agents. On January 10 of the 2017–18 season, Durant scored 40 points in a loss to the Clippers, becoming the second-youngest player in league history to reach the 20,000-point milestone. On January 23, he registered a career-high 14 assists in a win over the New York Knicks. On February 14, he scored a season-high 50 points in a loss to the Trail Blazers. In March, he missed games with a fractured rib, joining teammates Stephen Curry and Klay Thompson on the sidelines for the back-end of the season. Golden State eventually finished the year with 58 wins and Durant set a career high for blocks in season with 119.

In Game 1 of the Western Conference Finals, Durant scored 37 points in a win over the higher-seeded Houston Rockets. Through six games, the Warriors found themselves trailing 3–2, and Durant was criticized for contributing to Golden State's struggles by playing too much in isolation. The Warriors staved off elimination in Game 6, and in Game 7, Durant scored 34 points, helping Golden State return to the Finals with a series-clinching victory. In Game 3 of the 2018 NBA Finals, Durant recorded a playoff career-high 43 points, 13 rebounds, and seven assists in a win over the Cavaliers, leading the Warriors to a 3–0 advantage. Golden State ultimately swept Cleveland and clinched a second straight championship; with averages of 28.8 points, 10.8 rebounds, and 7.5 assists, Durant also won his second Finals MVP Award.

Three-peat chase and injury (2018–2019)

On July 7, 2018, Durant re-signed with the Warriors, on a reported two-year, $61.5 million contract, which included a player option for the second year. During an overtime loss to the Clippers on November 12, 2018, Green cursed out Durant over his upcoming free agency status after the season, and he was suspended for the much-publicized blowup. On November 29, Durant scored a season-high 51 points in a 131–128 overtime loss to the Toronto Raptors, thus scoring 40 or more in his third straight game. With Curry and Green sidelined for most of November, the Warriors finished the month with a 15–8 record and five straight road losses, after starting the season at 10–1.

In Game 5 of the first round of the playoffs, he scored a playoff career-high 45 points in a 129–121 loss to the Los Angeles Clippers. In Game 6, he set a new playoff career high with 50 points in a 129–110 win to close out the series. During Game 5 of the Western Conference semifinals against the Houston Rockets, Durant suffered a right calf strain, subsequently missing Game 6, in which the Warriors won the series, as well as the entire Western Conference Finals against the Portland Trail Blazers, which the Warriors won in a four-game sweep.

After missing nine games with the strained right calf, Durant returned to action in Game 5 of the 2019 NBA Finals against Toronto, and scored 11 points in the first quarter. However, he was lost for the game two minutes into the second quarter when he tried to drive by former teammate Serge Ibaka and suffered an Achilles tendon injury, falling and grabbing his lower right calf. He limped off the court and was helped to the locker room. The Warriors won the game to cut the Raptors' series lead to 3–2. The Warriors went on to lose the NBA Finals in Game 6, ending their quest for a three-peat.

Brooklyn Nets (2019–2023)

Year absence (2019–2020) 
On June 30, 2019, Durant announced that he planned to sign with the Brooklyn Nets after the July moratorium ended on July 6. On July 1, Golden State CEO Joe Lacob announced that Durant's No. 35 will no longer be issued by the Warriors. Durant signed with Brooklyn on July 7, in a sign-and-trade deal. Durant did not appear at all in the 2019–20 season and later revealed that he had decided shortly after his June 2019 injury that he would be sitting out the entire 2019–20 season. On March 17, 2020, Durant and three other Nets players tested positive for COVID-19. On April 1, it was announced that Durant was cleared and had recovered.

Return to the court (2020–2021) 
On December 22, 2020, Durant made his Nets debut, putting up 22 points, five rebounds, three assists and three steals, in a 125–99 win over the Golden State Warriors. On January 14, 2021, James Harden was traded to the Nets in a blockbuster four-team deal, reuniting Durant with his former Thunder teammate. On January 16, 2021, Durant scored a season-high 42 points in a 122–115 win over the Orlando Magic. On February 5, due to health and safety protocols, Durant came off the bench for the first time in his career in a 117–123 loss to the Toronto Raptors. In February, Durant suffered a hamstring injury, which forced him to miss 23 games. On April 2, the NBA fined Durant $50,000 for private messages he sent through social media to actor Michael Rapaport in a feud. Durant made his return on April 7, 2021, scoring 17 points off the bench in a 139–119 win over the New Orleans Pelicans.  The Nets finished the season with a 48–24 record, and the second seed in the East.

In Game 4 of the first round of the playoffs, Durant scored 42 points in a 141–126 win over the Boston Celtics to take a 3–1 lead in the series. In Game 5, he scored 24 points in a 123–109 win to close out the series. In Game 1 against the Milwaukee Bucks in the conference semifinals, Durant had 29 points and 10 rebounds in a 115–107 win. In Game 5, Durant put up 49 points, 17 rebounds, and 10 assists, leading the Nets to a 114–108 comeback win. In Game 7 against the Bucks, Durant dropped 48 points, nine rebounds, and six assists, including a two-pointer to send the game into overtime, in the 115–111 loss; Durant's 48 points were the most in a Game 7 in NBA playoff history.

Playoff disappointment (2021–2022) 
On August 8, 2021, Durant signed a four-year, $198 million extension with the Brooklyn Nets. On October 22, Durant recorded his thirteenth career triple-double, and first as a Net with 29 points, 15 rebounds, and 12 assists in a 114–109 comeback win over the Philadelphia 76ers. On November 10, Durant scored 30 points on 11-for-12 shooting in a 123–90 win over the Orlando Magic. On December 12, Durant scored a then season-high 51 points in a 116–104 win over the Detroit Pistons. On December 14, Durant recorded his fourteenth career triple-double with 34 points, 13 rebounds, and 11 assists in a 131–129 overtime win over the Toronto Raptors. On December 16, Durant scored 34 points, grabbed 11 rebounds, dished out eight assists in a 114–105 win against the Philadelphia 76ers. On January 15, 2022, during a 120–105 victory over the New Orleans Pelicans, Durant exited in the second quarter after suffering a left knee injury, later revealed to be a sprained MCL, and was subsequently ruled out for four to six weeks.

On March 3, his first game back from injury Durant scored 31 points in a 113–107 loss to the Miami Heat. On March 5, Durant became the 23rd player in NBA history to reach 25,000 points. On March 13, Durant scored a then season-high 53 points and set a career-high for field goal attempts with 37, grabbed 6 rebounds, delivered 9 assists along with 2 steals in a 110–107 win over the New York Knicks. It was his 60th career 40-point performance and his 8th career 50-point performance. On March 21, Durant put up 37 points, 9 rebounds and 8 assists in a 114–106 win over the Utah Jazz and moved past Jerry West into 22nd place on the NBA all-time career scoring list. On March 29, Durant scored 41 points, grabbed 11 rebounds, delivered 5 assists along with 3 blocks in a 130–123 win over the Detroit Pistons. On April 2, Durant scored a career-high 55 points on 19-of-28 shooting from the field and also had career high 8-of-10 from 3-point range in a 122–115 loss to the Atlanta Hawks. On April 10, in the final game of the regular season, Durant recorded his 16th career triple-double with a career-high 16 assists and added 20 points, 10 rebounds in a 134–126 win over the Indiana Pacers to lock up 7th spot for the play-in tournament.

On April 12, Durant in his first play-in appearance scored 25 points, grabbed 5 rebounds, dished out 11 assists along with 2 steals, and 3 blocks in a 115–108 win over the Cleveland Cavaliers to secure the 7th spot for the playoffs. In Game 1 of the First Round of the playoffs against the Boston Celtics, Durant passed Jerry West for 8th place on the NBA all-time playoff career scoring list. Brooklyn would go on to lose to Boston in four games despite Durant's 39-point, 7-rebound and 9-assist outing in the 116–112 close-out loss in Game 4. Over the first three contests, he would be held to just under 37% shooting from the field, including a 4-of-17 shooting performance in Game 2, in a series dominated by the Celtics’ top-ranked defense as Durant was swept for the first time in his 14-year NBA career.

Offseason trade request (2022–2023) 
On June 30, 2022, it was reported that Durant had requested a trade from the Nets. Durant's preferred trade destinations were the Phoenix Suns and the Miami Heat. The favorites to land Durant were the Toronto Raptors and Boston Celtics, two teams which he had also been interested in. On August 24, 2022, Durant rescinded his trade request after meeting with Nets management. On October 24, Durant scored 37 points on 14-for-20 shooting from the field in a 134–124 loss against the Memphis Grizzlies and moved past Alex English into 20th place on the NBA all-time career scoring list. On October 31, Durant recorded 36 points, 9 rebounds and 7 assists in a 116–109 win over the Indiana Pacers. He passed Vince Carter for 19th on the NBA all-time career scoring list. Durant scored at least 25 points in each of the first seven games of the season, the most in franchise history. On November 9, Durant posted a triple-double with 29 points, 12 rebounds and 12 assists in an 112–85 win over New York Knicks. His rebounds and assists were both season highs. On November 17, Durant scored 35 points in a 109–107 win over the Portland Trail Blazers. He became just the 19th player all-time to reach 26,000 career points. Durant also tied Michael Jordan for the sixth most consecutive 25-point games to start a season with 16. On November 23, Durant passed Kevin Garnett for 18th place on the NBA all-time career scoring list in an 112–98 win over the Toronto Raptors. On November 29, Durant scored a season-high 45 points on 19-of-24 shooting from the field and added seven rebounds and five assists in 109–102 win over the Orlando Magic. 

On December 18, Durant scored a career-high 26 of his 43 points in the third quarter, helping the Nets overcome a 17-point halftime deficit in a 124–121 victory over the Detroit Pistons. He was 8 of 10 from the floor, going 3 of 3 on 3-pointers and 7 of 7 from the free-throw line as he outscored the Pistons 26–25 in the third. Durant has scored at least 40 points in his last three games against Detroit - the first player to do that since Rick Barry in the 1966–67 season. He also passed John Havlicek and Paul Pierce for 16th place on the NBA all-time career scoring list. On December 26, Durant put up 32 points, nine rebounds, and five assists in a 125–117 win over the Cleveland Cavaliers and moved past Tim Duncan for 15th on the NBA all-time career scoring list. The next game, Durant had 26 points, a season-high 16 rebounds and 8 assists, and the Brooklyn Nets won their 10th straight game, 108–107 over the Atlanta Hawks. On January 3, despite Durant's 44-point outing on 15-of-22 shooting, 5-of-10 from three and 9-of-9 from the free throw line Chicago Bulls ended Brooklyn's 12-game winning streak. On January 8, Durant passed Dominique Wilkins for No. 14 on the NBA all-time career scoring list, though he ultimately exited the game against Miami with a right knee injury. The Nets closed out a 102–101 victory for their 18th win in 20 games. On January 26, Durant was named an Eastern Conference starter for the 2023 NBA All-Star Game, marking his 13th overall selection and 11th as a starter.

Phoenix Suns (2023–present)
On February 9, 2023, the Nets traded Durant, along with T. J. Warren, to the Phoenix Suns in exchange for Mikal Bridges, Cameron Johnson, Jae Crowder, four unprotected first-round picks, and a 2028 first-round pick swap. Although Durant wanted to continue wearing No. 7 as he did in Brooklyn, the number was retired by the Suns in honor of Kevin Johnson. As a result, Durant announced that he would return to wearing the No. 35 jersey, which he had worn throughout his college and professional career prior to joining the Nets. 

After being listed out since January 8 with a right knee injury, Durant made his Suns debut on March 1 against the Charlotte Hornets. He put up 23 points on 10-of-15 shooting in 27 minutes, contributing to the Suns' 105–91 win. On March 3 against the Chicago Bulls, Durant had another efficient night, scoring 20 points on 7-of-10 shooting. In addition, he moved up to 13th on the all-time scoring list, surpassing Oscar Robertson. Against the Dallas Mavericks on March 5, Durant led all scorers with 37 points, going 12-of-17 from the field and hitting the game-winning jump shot with 11.7 seconds left, guiding the Suns to a narrow 130–126 victory. Prior to his expected home debut against the Oklahoma City Thunder on March 8, Durant slipped on the court during pregame warmups and injured his left ankle. He was ruled out roughly 15 minutes before the opening tip-off. A day later, the Suns announced that Durant had suffered a left ankle sprain and would be re-evaluated in three weeks.

National team career
In February 2007, Durant received an invitation to the United States national team training camp. Despite a strong performance, he was cut from the team when its roster was trimmed to its twelve-player limit. Coach Mike Krzyzewski cited the experience of the remaining players as the deciding factor in making the cut. Durant was finally selected to the national team at the 2010 FIBA World Championship and became their leader as other All-Stars were unavailable, a role he downplayed. At the tournament, he led Team USA to its first FIBA World Championship since 1994, earning tournament MVP honors in the process. His final averages for the competition were 22.8 points, 6.1 rebounds, 1.8 assists, and 1.4 steals per game in nine games. In December, Durant was named 2010 USA Basketball Male Athlete of the Year for the first time in his career.

At the 2012 Olympics, Durant set the record for total points scored in an Olympic basketball tournament. With averages of 19.5 points, 5.8 rebounds, 2.6 assists, and 1.6 steals per game, he helped the national team go undefeated en route to a gold medal. In the tournament's final game, he led all scorers with 30 points. Less than a month before the start of the 2014 FIBA Basketball World Cup, Durant announced that he would be dropping out of the competition, citing mental and physical exhaustion as reasons for his departure. He rejoined Team USA on the 2016 Olympic team, where he led them to a gold medal. His final averages for the competition were 19.4 points, 5.0 rebounds and 3.5 assists per game in 8 games. In recognition of his performances, Durant was named the 2016 co-USA Basketball Male Athlete of the Year, along with Carmelo Anthony, for the second time in his career.

Durant committed to playing on the 2020 Olympic team, delayed until 2021 because of the COVID-19 pandemic. He entered the Games ranked second in U.S. men's Olympic basketball history with 311 career points, needing 25 to match Anthony's record of 336. Durant broke Anthony's record on July 31 against the Czech Republic. He led Team USA to a gold medal, and FIBA named him the tournament's MVP. Durant's 20.7 points per game set a U.S. Olympic men's single-competition record for points averaged, and he tied Carmelo Anthony for most Olympic gold medals (three). He is also one of just four U.S. male basketball athletes to play in three or more Olympics. In recognition of his accomplishments in the tournament, Durant was named 2021 USA Basketball Male Athlete of the Year for the third time in his career.

From 2010 to 2021, Durant played with the senior men's United States national team in 31 official games, in major FIBA tournaments, averaging 20.4 points, 5.4 rebounds and 3.1 assists. Overall, he brought home four gold medals as member of the national team: three from Olympic tournaments and one from the 2010 FIBA World Championship. Durant, who has led the US in scoring in all three of his Olympic appearances and at the 2010 FIBA World Championship, owns eight U.S. Olympic men's career records, including the top spot for points (435), points averaged (19.8), field goals made (146) and attempted (276), 3-point field goals made (74) and attempted (148) and free throws made (69) and attempted (80).

Player profile

Durant's height is officially  and his primary position is small forward. In December 2016, Durant stated that his height in shoes was actually  and that he understated his height in order to be listed as a small forward, rather than a power forward. His career averages are 27.2 points, 7.1 rebounds, and 4.3 assists per game. Widely regarded as one of the greatest players of all time, Durant has earned All-NBA honors ten times (2010–2014, 2016–2019, 2022) and was voted Rookie of the Year in his debut season. He has also won an MVP Award and finished second in the voting three times, a trend that he has expressed frustration over.

Durant is best known for his prodigious scoring ability. From 2010 to 2014, he won four scoring titles, becoming one of only two players to win four scoring titles in a five-year span. Early in his career, his playing style was isolation-driven, but he quickly developed into an excellent off-ball player who was capable of scoring from the outside as well. By 2013, he was shooting at a historically great clip, which helped him become one of only nine members of the 50–40–90 club. This ability to impact the offense in a variety of ways helped Durant remain effective and improve an already elite offense upon joining the Warriors in 2016. Throughout his career, his height and  wingspan have created matchup problems for defenses as he is able to get off a clean shot regardless of the situation. Upon beating his man or gaining momentum, he also becomes a strong finisher at the rim; for example, he converted 72.2% of shots in the paint in 2012.

Early in Durant's career, he was criticized for his slim build, defense, and passing. Over time, he grew as a playmaker, increasing his assist numbers every year from 2010 to 2014, though his overall vision still lagged behind the league's best passers'. He also showed defensive improvement, with opponents averaging just .62 points per isolation play against him in 2014, the best success rate for defensive players who faced at least 100 isolations that season. Upon going to Golden State, he developed into a more reliable off-ball defender and rim protector, and in 2018 was considered for the NBA Defensive Player of the Year Award.

Off the court 

Durant is very close with his mother, Wanda, a relationship that was detailed in the Lifetime movie The Real MVP: The Wanda Pratt Story. During his time with the Thunder, Durant described himself as a "high school kid" who enjoys playing video games in his spare time. A Christian, Durant has religious tattoos on his stomach, wrist, and back. He owns several properties in the Oklahoma City area and listed his primary residence, located in the affluent Club Villa neighborhood, for sale for $1.95 million in 2013. That same year, he opened a restaurant, KD's Southern Cuisine, in the Bricktown neighborhood and briefly became engaged to Monica Wright, a WNBA player. In 2016, he was a credentialed photographer for The Players' Tribune at Super Bowl 50.

Durant was formerly represented by agents Aaron Goodwin and Rob Pelinka. He left Pelinka in 2013 and signed with the Roc Nation group, headed by Jay-Z. Durant has endorsement deals with Nike, Sprint, Gatorade, Panini, General Electric, and 2K Sports. In 2012, he tried his hand at acting, appearing in the children's film Thunderstruck. In 2013, he earned $35 million, making him the fourth-highest-earning basketball player that year. In an interview with Sports Illustrated, Durant claimed that, despite his high earnings potential, "global marketing and all that stuff" does not interest him.

One of the most popular players in the league, Durant's jersey regularly ranks as one of the NBA's best-selling and he is consistently one of the top All-Star vote-getters. Early in his career, he developed a reputation for his kind demeanor; in 2013, Foot Locker released a series of commercials calling him the "nicest guy in the NBA", and become a beloved figure in Oklahoma City, known for his "nice escapades" toward the Thunder's staff. In 2014, he partnered with KIND snacks and launched StrongAndKind.com to show "being kind is not a sign of weakness." Since joining the Warriors, he has become more outspoken and controversial; for example, he was involved in a Twitter back-and-forth with CJ McCollum in July 2018. Durant has admitted to feeling more genuine in Golden State as opposed to Oklahoma City, where he was "just trying to please everybody".

Throughout his career, Durant has participated in philanthropic causes. In 2013, he pledged $1 million to the American Red Cross for the victims of the 2013 Moore tornado. His generosity inspired the Thunder and Nike to match his donation. He is also a spokesperson for the Washington, D. C. branch of P'Tones Records, a nationwide non-profit after-school music program.

In 2017, Durant became involved with YouTube. In February, he visited YouTube's headquarters for a speaking engagement. On April 7, 2017, he created a YouTube account and soon began to upload live stream vlogs onto it. In his first vlog, he detailed, "I'm so excited because I got off social media. I got off the Instagram, Twitter, all that stuff, just to distance myself a bit. But somebody talked me into getting on the YouTube." As of June 2020, Durant's YouTube channel has received over 790,000 subscribers and 38 million video views. On February 13, 2018, Deadline reported that Durant, in partnership with producer Brian Grazer's Imagine Television, will create a basketball-themed scripted drama for Apple.

In 2017, Durant and business partner Rich Kleiman founded Thirty Five Ventures. In 2020, Thirty Five Ventures produced Basketball County, a documentary about youth basketball in Durant's home county of Prince George's County, Maryland. Durant served as an executive producer and appeared in interviews. Thirty Five Ventures' work Two Distant Strangers won the 2021 Academy Award for Short Film (Live Action).

Durant was included in Time magazine's 100 Most Influential People of 2018.

On June 15, 2020, Durant became a minority owner of MLS side Philadelphia Union, acquiring a 5% stake with the possibility to add another 5% in the near future.

In August 2021, Durant announced a partnership between his multimedia company Boardroom and the cannabis technology company Weedmaps through which an original content series would be developed and Weedmaps would become an official sponsor of Boardroom. Durant said of the partnership: "I think it's far past time to address the stigmas around cannabis that still exist in the sports world as well as globally. This partnership is going to help us continue to normalize those conversations, as well as create content, events, and a lot more through our Boardroom media network."

On December 22, 2021, he had signed a deal with Coinbase to serve as a brand ambassador.

In October 2022, Durant joined fellow professional athletes LeBron James, Tom Brady, and Drew Brees as an investor in a professional pickleball team with his business partner, Rich Kleiman, via their Thirty Five Ventures (35V) firm.

Career statistics

Source:

NBA

Regular season

|-
| style="text-align:left;"|
| style="text-align:left;"|Seattle
| 80 || 80 || 34.6 || .430 || .288 || .873 || 4.4 || 2.4 || 1.0 || .9 || 20.3
|-
| style="text-align:left;"|
| style="text-align:left;"|Oklahoma City
| 74 || 74 || 39.0 || .476 || .422 || .863 || 6.5 || 2.8 || 1.3 || .7 || 25.3
|-
| style="text-align:left;"|
| style="text-align:left;"|Oklahoma City
| style="background:#cfecec;"|82* || style="background:#cfecec;"|82* || 39.5 || .476 || .365 || .900 || 7.6 || 2.8 || 1.4 || 1.0 || style="background:#cfecec;"|30.1*
|-
| style="text-align:left;"|
| style="text-align:left;"|Oklahoma City
| 78 || 78 || 38.9 || .462 || .350 || .880 || 6.8 || 2.7 || 1.1 || 1.0 || style="background:#cfecec;"|27.7*
|-
| style="text-align:left;"|
| style="text-align:left;"|Oklahoma City
| style="background:#cfecec;"|66* || style="background:#cfecec;"|66* || 38.6 || .496 || .387 || .860 || 8.0 || 3.5 || 1.3 || 1.2 || style="background:#cfecec;"|28.0*
|-
| style="text-align:left;"|
| style="text-align:left;"|Oklahoma City
| 81 || 81 || 38.5 || .510 || .416 || style="background:#cfecec;"|.905* || 7.9 || 4.6 || 1.4 || 1.3 || 28.1
|-
| style="text-align:left;"|
| style="text-align:left;"|Oklahoma City
| 81 || 81 || 38.5 || .503 || .391 || .873 || 7.4 || 5.5 || 1.3 || .7 || style="background:#cfecec;"|32.0*
|-
| style="text-align:left;"|
| style="text-align:left;"|Oklahoma City
| 27 || 27 || 33.8 || .510 || .403 || .854 || 6.6 || 4.1 || .9 || .9 || 25.4
|-
| style="text-align:left;"|
| style="text-align:left;"|Oklahoma City
| 72 || 72 || 35.8 || .505 || .387 || .898 || 8.2 || 5.0 || 1.0 || 1.2 || 28.2
|-
| style="text-align:left; background:#afe6ba;"|
| style="text-align:left;"|Golden State
| 62 || 62 || 33.4 || .537 || .375 || .875 || 8.3 || 4.8 || 1.1 || 1.6 || 25.1
|-
| style="text-align:left; background:#afe6ba;"|
| style="text-align:left;"|Golden State
| 68 || 68 || 34.2 || .516 || .419 || .889 || 6.8 || 5.4 || .7 || 1.8 || 26.4
|-
| style="text-align:left;"|
| style="text-align:left;"|Golden State
| 78 || 78 || 34.6 || .521 || .353 || .885 || 6.4 || 5.9 || .7 || 1.1 || 26.0
|-
| style="text-align:left;"|
| style="text-align:left;"|Brooklyn
| 35 || 32 || 33.1 || .537 || .450 || .882 || 7.1 || 5.6 || .7 || 1.3 || 26.9
|-
| style="text-align:left;"|
| style="text-align:left;"|Brooklyn
| 55 || 55 || 37.2 || .518 || .383 || .910 || 7.4 || 6.4 || .9 || .9 || 29.9
|-
| style="text-align:left;"|
| style="text-align:left;"|Brooklyn
| 39 || 39 || 36.0 || .559 || .376 || .934 || 6.7 || 5.3 || .8 || 1.5 || 29.7
|- class="sortbottom"
| style="text-align:center;" colspan="2"|Career
| 978 || 975 || 36.7 || .498 || .384 || .886 || 7.1 || 4.3 || 1.1 || 1.1 || 27.3
|- class="sortbottom"
| style="text-align:center;" colspan="2"|All-Star
| 10 || 8 || 26.9 || .536 || .349 || .897 || 6.2 || 3.7 || 1.7 || .5 || 25.0

Playoffs

|-
| style="text-align:left;"|2010
| style="text-align:left;"|Oklahoma City
| 6 || 6 || 38.5 || .350 || .286 || .871 || 7.7 || 2.3 || .5 || 1.3 || 25.0
|-
| style="text-align:left;"|2011
| style="text-align:left;"|Oklahoma City
| 17 || 17 || 42.5 || .449 || .339 || .838 || 8.2 || 2.8 || .9 || 1.1 || 28.6
|-
| style="text-align:left;"|2012
| style="text-align:left;"|Oklahoma City
| 20 || 20 || 41.9 || .517 || .373 || .864 || 7.4 || 3.7 || 1.5 || 1.2 || 28.5
|-
| style="text-align:left;"|2013
| style="text-align:left;"|Oklahoma City
| 11 || 11 || 44.1 || .455 || .314 || .830 || 9.0 || 6.3 || 1.3 || 1.1 || 30.8
|-
| style="text-align:left;"|2014
| style="text-align:left;"|Oklahoma City
| 19 || 19 || 42.9 || .460 || .344 || .810 || 8.9 || 3.9 || 1.0 || 1.3 || 29.6
|-
| style="text-align:left;"|2016
| style="text-align:left;"|Oklahoma City
| 18 || 18 || 40.3 || .430 || .282 || .890 || 7.1 || 3.3 || 1.0 || 1.0 || 28.4
|-
| style="text-align:left; background:#afe6ba;|2017†
| style="text-align:left;"|Golden State
| 15 || 15 || 35.5 || .556 || .442 || .893 || 7.9 || 4.3 || .8 || 1.3 || 28.5
|-
| style="text-align:left; background:#afe6ba;|2018†
| style="text-align:left;"|Golden State
| 21 || 21 || 38.4 || .487 || .341 || .901 || 7.8 || 4.7 || .7 || 1.2 || 29.0
|-
| style="text-align:left;"|2019
| style="text-align:left;"|Golden State
| 12 || 12 || 36.8 || .514 || .438 || .903 || 4.9 || 4.5 || 1.1 || 1.0 || 32.3
|-
| style="text-align:left;"|2021
| style="text-align:left;"|Brooklyn
| 12 || 12 || 40.4 || .514 || .402 || .871 || 9.3 || 4.4 || 1.5 || 1.6 || 34.3
|-
| style="text-align:left;"|2022
| style="text-align:left;"|Brooklyn
| 4 || 4 || 44.0 || .386 || .333 || .895 || 5.8 || 6.3 || 1.0 || 0.3 || 26.3
|- class="sortbottom"
| style="text-align:center;" colspan="2"|Career
| 155 || 155 || 40.4 || .476 || .356 || .866 || 7.8 || 4.1 || 1.0 || 1.2 || 29.4

College

|-
| style="text-align:left;"|2006–07
| style="text-align:left;"|Texas
| 35 || 35 || 35.9 || .473 || .404 || .816 || 11.1 || 1.3 || 1.9 || 1.9 || 25.8

Awards and honors

NBA
Cited from Basketball Reference's Kevin Durant page unless noted otherwise.
 2× NBA champion: 2017, 2018
 2× NBA Finals Most Valuable Player: 2017, 2018
 NBA Most Valuable Player: 2014
 13× NBA All-Star: 2010–2019, 2021–2023
 6× All-NBA First Team: 2010–2014, 2018
 4× All-NBA Second Team: 2016, 2017, 2019, 2022
 4× NBA scoring champion: 2010–2012, 2014
 2× NBA All-Star Game MVP: 2012, 2019
 NBA Rookie of the Year: 2008
 NBA All-Rookie First Team: 2008
 NBA Rookie Challenge MVP: 2009

USA Basketball
Cited from USA Basketball's Kevin Durant page unless noted otherwise.
 3× Olympic gold medalist: 2012, 2016, 2020
 Olympics Most Valuable Player: 2020
 FIBA World Cup gold medalist: 2010
 FIBA World Cup Most Valuable Player: 2010
 3× USA Basketball Male Athlete of the Year: 2010, 2016, 2021

NCAA
 Naismith College Player of the Year: 2007
 NABC Division I Player of the Year: 2007
 Oscar Robertson Trophy: 2007
 Adolph Rupp Trophy: 2007
 John R. Wooden Award: 2007
 Big 12 Player of the Year: 2007
 USBWA National Freshman of the Year: 2007
 Jersey number (35) retired at Texas

Media
 AP Player of the Year: 2007
 AP All-America 1st Team: 2007
 Two-time ESPY Award winner:
2014 Best NBA Player
2017 Outstanding Team (as a member of the Golden State Warriors)

See also

 List of National Basketball Association career scoring leaders
 List of National Basketball Association career 3-point scoring leaders
 List of National Basketball Association career free throw scoring leaders
 List of National Basketball Association career playoff scoring leaders
 List of National Basketball Association career playoff turnovers leaders
 List of National Basketball Association career playoff 3-point scoring leaders

References

External links

 

1988 births
Living people
2010 FIBA World Championship players
All-American college men's basketball players
American Christians
American men's basketball players
American YouTubers
Basketball players at the 2012 Summer Olympics
Basketball players at the 2016 Summer Olympics
Basketball players at the 2020 Summer Olympics
Basketball players from Maryland
Basketball players from Washington, D.C.
Brooklyn Nets players
Businesspeople in the cannabis industry
FIBA World Championship-winning players
Golden State Warriors players
Male bloggers
McDonald's High School All-Americans
Medalists at the 2012 Summer Olympics
Medalists at the 2016 Summer Olympics
Medalists at the 2020 Summer Olympics
National Basketball Association All-Stars
NJ/NY Gotham FC owners
Oak Hill Academy (Mouth of Wilson, Virginia) alumni
Oklahoma City Thunder players
Olympic gold medalists for the United States in basketball
Parade High School All-Americans (boys' basketball)
Phoenix Suns players
Seattle SuperSonics draft picks
Seattle SuperSonics players
Small forwards
Sportspeople from Rockville, Maryland
Texas Longhorns men's basketball players
United States men's national basketball team players
YouTube vloggers